A showroom is a large space used to display products or show entertainment. 

Showroom may also refer to:

The Showroom, not-for-profit art gallery in London
Showrooming, practice of examining merchandise in a physical store then buying it online
Showroom (streaming service), Japanese live streaming platform
Showroom Cinema, Sheffield, cinema in Sheffield, England